Lieutenant General Jean Jacques Paradis CMM, CD (7 November 1928 – 31 August 2007) was the Commander, Mobile Command of the Canadian Forces.

Military career
Educated at the Collège Jean-de-Brébeuf and the Université de Montréal, Paradis was commissioned the Royal 22e Régiment in 1950. He served in Korea and Germany and then became Commanding Officer of the 3e Bataillon in 1966.

He was made a Director at the Canadian Army Staff College in 1968 and appointed Commander of the 5 Canadian Mechanized Brigade Group at Valcartier in 1972. He became Chief of Personnel in 1975 and Commander, Mobile Command in 1977.

In retirement he became Overseas Marketing Director at Industries Valcartier, a munitions business, and a Director of The Arches Foundation of Quebec, an organisation supporting the development of L'Arche communities in Quebec.

He died after a long illness on 31 August 2007.

References

1928 births
2007 deaths
Canadian generals
Canadian military personnel of the Korean War
Commanders of the Order of Military Merit (Canada)
People from Montreal
Université de Montréal alumni
Commanders of the Canadian Army
Military personnel from Montreal
Royal 22nd Regiment officers